Occupation of Gaza may refer to:
The Egyptian occupation of the Gaza Strip 1948/1959–1967
The Israeli-occupied territories 1967–1994
The Battle of Gaza (2007) and Hamas' takeover of the Gaza Strip